Ablitas is a town and municipality located in the province and autonomous community of Navarra, northern Spain.

Demography 
From:INE Archiv

References

External links

 ABLITAS in the Bernardo Estornés Lasa - Auñamendi Encyclopedia (Euskomedia Fundazioa) 
Ablitas Website 

Municipalities in Navarre